Edward Webb Cooch Sr. (January 17, 1876 – November 22, 1964) was an American politician who served as the tenth Lieutenant Governor of Delaware from January 19, 1937, to January 21, 1941, under Governor Richard C. McMullen.

References

External links
 Delaware's Lieutenant Governors

Lieutenant Governors of Delaware
1876 births
1964 deaths
University of Delaware alumni
Harvard Law School alumni